Stenolechia celeris is a moth of the family Gelechiidae. It is found in the Russian Far East.

References

Moths described in 1988
Stenolechia